The House of Nobility in Stockholm, Sweden, is a corporation and a building that maintains records and acts as an interest group on behalf of the Swedish nobility.

Name
The name is literally translated as House of Knights, as the knights belong to the higher ranks of the Swedish nobility, sometimes also together with titles as count and baron. All esquires are also represented in the corporation (most of the families are so called untitled nobility). This is a tradition from the Middle Ages when Sweden during the Kalmar Union only had one knight: Sten Sture.

History 
Between the 17th and the 19th century the House of Nobility was a chamber in the Riksdag of the Estates.

In the 18th century, the building was often used for public concerts. From 1731, public concerts were performed here by Kungliga Hovkapellet. Elisabeth Olin is believed to have debuted here in the 1750s, and foreign artists performed such as Elisabetta Almerighi, Giovanni Ansani (1772) and Rosa Scarlatti.

In 1866, the Parliament of the Estates was replaced by the new Parliament of Sweden. From then on, the House of Nobility served as a quasi-official representative body for the Swedish nobility, regulated by the Swedish government. Since 2003, it has been a private institution which maintains records and acts as an interest group on behalf of the Swedish nobility, its main purpose being to maintain old traditions and culture.

Building 
The Riddarhuset is also the name of the building maintained by the corporation in Stockholm old town. The French-born architect Simon de la Vallée started the planning of the building, but was killed by a Swedish nobleman in 1642. The plans were eventually finished by his son, Jean de la Vallée, in 1660.

The south end of the building carries the Latin inscription CLARIS MAIORUM EXEMPLIS, after the clear example of the forefathers, and holds a statue of Gustav Vasa, the king of Sweden 1523-1560. North of the building is a park in which is a statue of Axel Oxenstierna.

The architecture of the old main library in Turku, Finland, was influenced by the Swedish House of Nobility.

Gallery

See also 
 Architecture of Stockholm
 List of Swedish noble families
 Finnish House of Nobility
 Riddarhustorget
 Riddarholmen

External links
Official Riddarhuset website
Riddarhuset.se: Archives

Buildings and structures in Stockholm
.
Social history of Sweden
Defunct upper houses
Legislative buildings in Europe
Seats of national legislatures
1660 establishments in Sweden
Buildings and structures completed in 1660
Baroque architecture in Sweden